Phare Petit-Canal is a Guadeloupean football club that is based in the commune of Petit-Canal. The club competes in the Guadeloupe Division of Honor, the top tier of football on the island.

Squad

External links 

 
 Phare Petit-Canal at FFF at French Football Federation

Moulien
CS Moulien